Okay Ka, Fairy Ko! is a Philippine television fantasy situational comedy series broadcast by Intercontinental Broadcasting Corporation, ABS-CBN and GMA Network. Directed by Bert de Leon, it stars Vic Sotto, Charito Solis and Alice Dixson. It premiered on November 26, 1987 and concluded on April 3, 1997.

Cast and characters

Lead cast
 Vic Sotto as Enteng Kabisote / Vicente Kabisote Jr.
 Alice Dixson, Tweetie de Leon, Roderick Paulate and Dawn Zulueta as Faye
 Charito Solis as Ina Magenta
Bayani Casimiro Sr. as Edad / Vicente Kabisote Sr.

Supporting cast
 Aiza Seguerra as Aiza
 Ruby Rodriguez as Amy
 Jinky Oda as Bale
 Larry Silva as Pipoy
 Bayani Casimiro Jr. as Prinsipe K
 Debraliz as Yaya E
 Oyo Boy Sotto as Benok
 CJ Ramos as Benok
 Luz Fernandez as Luka
 Tetchie Agbayani as Muñita
 Odette Khan as Satana
 Spencer Reyes as Spencer
 Maribeth Betchara as Betchay
 Ben Tisoy as Tisoy
 Richie D’Horsie as Richie
 Chuck Robles

Films

References

External links
 

Enteng Kabisote
1987 Philippine television series debuts
1997 Philippine television series endings
ABS-CBN original programming
Filipino-language television shows
GMA Network original programming
Intercontinental Broadcasting Corporation original programming
M-Zet Productions films
Philippine comedy television series
Television series by M-Zet Productions